The Very Best Of Alyssa Milano is a compilation album recorded by Alyssa Milano during her pursuit, mainly in Japan, of a singing career. A more complete collection of Milano's greatest hits and other singles than the previously released The Best In The World remix collection. The album was only released as a promotional CD.

Track listing

Singles
No singles were issued from this album, which was never released in the United States. It was only made in Japan, and solely as a promotional album.

Alyssa Milano compilation albums
1995 greatest hits albums